Nové Zámky District (okres Nové Zámky) is a district in
the Nitra Region of western Slovakia. 
Until 1918, the area of the district was split between several county of Kingdom of Hungary: the largest area in the north formed part of Nitra; an area in the south between Dvory nad Žitavou and Strekov 
formed part of Komárno; an area in the north-east around Veľké Lovce 
formed part of Tekov; a sizable area in the east formed part of Esztergom (Ostrihom); and a small area around Salka formed part of Hont County.

Population

Municipalities

References 

Districts of Slovakia
Geography of Nitra Region